This is a list of FIA member organisations. These are the clubs, local authorities and governing bodies that work on a more localized level to help the global Fédération Internationale de l'Automobile (FIA) organise racing events, among other pursuits.

There are hundreds of different groups all around the world. Not every country is necessarily represented (yet), and only a select few of these are actually regarded as motorsport groups – a great number of them are motorist service organizations or touring groups, concerned more with road travel than competition.

The list is broken out alphabetically, by continent, and with organisation initials included where available.

Africa

Mechanical Sports Federation of Algeria (FASM) – Sport and Mobility
Touring Club of Algeria (TCA) – Mobility

Botswana Motor Sports – Sport
Emergency Assist 991 – Mobility

Automobile Club of Burundi (CAB) – Sport and Mobility

Automobile Federation of the Democratic Republic of Congo (FEDACO) – Sport and Mobility

Automobile and Touring Club of Egypt (ATCE) – Sport and Mobility
Ministry of Tourism of the Arab Republic of Egypt – Mobility

National Federation Motor Racing Eritrea – Sport

Ethiopian Motor Association (EMA) – Sport and Mobility

Automobile Club of Gabon – Sport and Mobility

Federation Ivoirienne Du Sport Automobile (FISAM) – Sport

Automobile Association of Kenya (AAK) – Mobility
Kenya Motor Sports Foundation (KMSF) – Sport

Automobile and Touring Club of Libya (ATCL) – Sport and Mobility

Automobile Sport Federation of Madagascar (FSAM) – Sport

Mechanical Sports Federation of Mauritania – Sport

Club Automobile de Rallye (CAR) – Sport

Royal Moroccan Federation of Motor Sport (FRMSA) – Sport
Royal Automobile Club of Morocco (RACM) – Mobility

Automobile and Touring Club of Mozambique (ATCM) – Sport and Mobility

Automobile Association of Namibia (AAN) – Mobility
Namibia Motor Sport Federation (NMSF) – Sport

Automobile Sports Club of Nigeria (ASCN) – Sport
Automobile and Touring Club of Nigeria – Mobility

Rwanda Automobile Club (RAC) – Sport and Mobility

Senegalaise Federation of Motor Sport and Motorcycle (FSSAM) – Sport
Federation Senegalaise Des Rally (FSR) – Sport

Automobile Association of South Africa (AASA) – Mobility
Motorsport South Africa (MSA) – Sport

Sudan Automobile and Tourism Club (SAC) – Mobility
Sudanese Automobile and Touring Club (SATC) – Sport and Mobility

Automobile Association of Tanzania (AAT) – Sport and Mobility

National Automobile Club of Tunisia (NACT) – Sport and Mobility
Touring Club of Tunisia (TCT) – Mobility

Automobile Association of Uganda (AA Uganda) – Mobility
Federation of Motor Sports Clubs of Uganda (FMU) – Sport

Zambia Motor Sport Association (ZMSA) – Sport

Automobile Association of Zimbabwe (AAZ) – Mobility
Zimbabwe Motor Sports Federation (ZMSF) – Sport

Asia (FIA Asia)

Arvikon Automobile and Tourist Club – Mobility
Automobile Federation of Armenia (FAA) – Sport and Mobility

Azerbaijan Automobile Federation (AAF) – Sport

Bahrain Motor Federation (BMF) – Sport and Mobility

Automobile Association of Bangladesh (AAB) – Sport and Mobility

Automobile Association of Cambodia – Sport and Mobility

China Tourism Automobile and Cruise Association (CTACA) – Mobility
Federation of Automobile and Motorcycle Sports of China (CAMF) – Sport and Mobility

Automobile Association of Georgia – Mobility
Georgian Automobile Federation – Mobility
Georgian Automobile Sport Federation – Sport

Hong Kong Automobile Association (HKAA) – Sport and Mobility

Federation of Indian Automobile Associations (FIAA) – Mobility
Federation of Motor Sports Clubs of India (FMSCI) – Sport and Mobility

Indonesian Motor Association (IMI) – Sport and Mobility

Motorcycle and Automobile Federation of the Islamic Republic of Iran (MAFIRI) – Sport
Touring and Automobile Club of the Islamic Republic of Iran (TACI) – Mobility

Iraq Automobile and Touring Association – Mobility
Iraq Club for Cars and Motorcycles – Sport

Automobile and Touring Club of Israel (MEMSI) – Sport and Mobility

Japan Automobile Federation (JAF) – Sport and Mobility

Royal Automobile Club of Jordan (RACJ) – Sport and Mobility

Automotorsport Federation of Republic of Kazakhstan – Sport
Off Road Kazakhstan – Mobility

Kuwait Automobile and Touring Club (KATC) – Mobility
Kuwait International Automobile Club (KIAC) – Sport and Mobility

Auto Motor Sport and Road Safety Federation – Sport

Automobile and Touring Club of Lebanon (ATCL) – Sport and Mobility

Automobile General Association Macao-China (China-Macau Autosports Club) – Sport and Mobility

Motorsports Association of Malaysia (MAM) – Sport

Nepal Automobiles' Association – Sport

Oman Automobile Association (OAA) – Sport and Mobility

Automobile Association of Pakistan (AAP) – Mobility
Motorsport Association of Pakistan (MAP) – Sport

Palestinian Motor Sport and Motorcycle Federation – Sport and Mobility

Automobile Association Philippines (AAP) – Sport and Mobility

Qatar Automobile and Touring Club (QATC) – Mobility
Qatar Motor and Motorcycle Federation (QMMF) – Sport

Saudi Arabian Motor Sport Federation (SAMSF) – Sport
Saudi Automobile and Touring Association (SATA) – Mobility
Saudi Automobile Federation (SAF) – Mobility

Automobile Association of Singapore (AAS) – Mobility
Motor Sports Singapore (MSS) – Sport and Mobility

Korea Automobile Association (KAA) – Mobility
Korea Automobile Racing Association (KARA) – Sport

Automobile Association of Ceylon (AAC) – Mobility
Ceylon Motor Sports Club (CMSC) – Sport

Automobile and Touring Club of Syria (ATCS) – Mobility
Syrian Automobile Club (SAC) – Sport and Mobility
 Chinese Taipei (Taiwan)
Chinese Taipei Automobile Association (CTAA) – Mobility
Chinese Taipei Motor Sports Association (CTMSA) – Sport

Royal Automobile Association of Thailand (RAAT) – Sport and Mobility

National Center of Automobile Sports of Turkmenistan – Sport

Automobile & Touring Club of the United Arab Emirates – Sport and Mobility

National Automobile Club of Uzbekistan – Sport

Yemen Club for Touring and Automobile (YCTA) – Sport and Mobility

Europe

Automobile Club Albania (ACA) – Sport and Mobility

Automobile Club of Andorra (ACA) – Sport and Mobility

Austrian Automobile Motorcycle and Touring Club (ÖAMTC) – Sport and Mobility
Austrian Camping Club (ÖCC) – Mobility

Belarusian Auto Moto Touring Club (BKA) – Mobility
Automobile Federation of Belarus (FAB) – Sport and Mobility

Royal Automobile Club of Belgium (RACB) – Sport and Mobility
Touring Club Belgium (TCB) – Mobility

Bosnia and Herzegovina Automobile Club (BIHAMK) – Mobility

Bulgarian Automobile Union (UAB) – Sport and Mobility

Croatian Automobile & Karting Federation (CAKF) – Sport
Croatian Auto Club (HAK) – Mobility

Cyprus Automobile Association (CAA) – Sport and Mobility

Autoclub of the Czech Republic (ACCR) – Sport and Mobility
Ustredni Automotoklub CR (UAMK CR) – Mobility

Danish Automobile Sports Union (DASU) – Sport
United Danish Motor Owners (FDM) – Mobility

Automobile Club of Estonia (EAK) – Mobility
Estonian Autosport Union (EASU) – Sport and Mobility

AKK Motorsport (AKK) – Sport
Automobile and Touring Club of Finland (AL) – Mobility
SF-Caravan (SFC) – Mobility

Automobile Club of France (ACF) – Mobility
Automobile Club Association – Mobility
Fédération Française du Sport Automobile (FFSA) – Sport
French Federation of Camping and Caravanning (FFCC) – Mobility

Allgemeiner Deutscher Automobil-Club (ADAC) – Mobility
Automobilclub von Deutschland (AVD) – Mobility
Deutscher Motor Sport Bund (DMSB) – Sport

Hellenic Motorsport Federation (OMAE) – Sport and Mobility

Hungarian Auto Club (MAK) – Mobility
National Automobile Sport Federation of Hungary (MNASZ) – Sport

Icelandic Automobile Association (FIB) – Mobility
Icelandic Motorsport Association (AKIS) – Sport

Automobile Association Ireland (AA Ireland)
Royal Irish Automobile Club (RIAC) – Sport
Motorsport Ireland – Sport

Automobile Club d'Italia (ACI) – Sport and Mobility

Auto Moto Club Kosova (AMCK) – Mobility
Federation of Auto Sport of Kosovo (FASK) – Sport
Kosova Touring Assistance (NTK) – Mobility
Shoqata Auto Moto Dardania (SAMD) – Mobility

Auto-Moto Society of Latvia (LAMB) – Mobility
Latvian Federation of Motor Vehicles (LAF) – Sport

Automobile Club of the Principality of Liechtenstein (ACFL) – Sport and Mobility

Association of Lithuanian Automobilists (LAS) – Mobility
Lithuanian Automobile Club (LAC) – Mobility
Lithuanian Automobile Sport Federation (LASF) – Sport

Automobile Club of Luxembourg (ACL) – Sport and Mobility

Auto-Moto Association of Macedonia (AMSM) – Mobility

Malta Motorsport Federation (MMF) – Sport
Touring Club Malta (TCM) – Mobility

Automobile Club of Moldova – Sport and Mobility
International Association of Road Hauliers of Moldova – Mobility

Automobile Club de Monaco (ACM) – Sport and Mobility

Auto-Moto Association of Montenegro (AMSCG) – Sport and Mobility

KNAC National Autosport Federation (KNAF) – Sport
Royal Dutch Automobile Club (KNAC) – Mobility
Royal Dutch Touring Club (ANWB) – Mobility

Norwegian Automobile Federation (NAF) – Mobility
Royal Norwegian Automobile Club (KNA) – Sport and Mobility

Polish Automobile and Motorcycle Association (PZM) – Sport and Mobility

Automobile Club of Portugal (ACP) – Mobility
Portuguese Federation of Auto Racing and Karting (FPAK) – Sport
Federation of Portuguese Cycling and Bike Users (FPCUB) – Mobility

Automobile Club of Romania (ACR) – Sport and Mobility

Autoclub Assistance-Rus (ACAR) – Mobility
Russian Automobile Federation (RAF) – Sport and Mobility
Russian Automobile Society (RAS) – Mobility
Russian Federation Auto Sport and Tourism (RFAST) – Mobility

Auto Motoring Federation of San Marino (FAMS) – Sport

Auto-Moto Association of Serbia (AMSS) – Sport and Mobility

Slovak Association of Motor Sport (SAMS) – Sport
Slovakian Autotourist Club (SATC) – Mobility
Autoklub Slovakia Assistance – Mobility

 (AMZS) – Mobility
Auto Sport Federation of Slovenia – Sport

Royal Automobile Club of Spain (RACE) – Mobility
Royal Spanish Automobile Federation (RFEDA) – Sport
Royal Automobile Club of Catalonia (RACC) – Mobility

Royal Automobile Club (KAK) – Mobility
Riksförbundet M Sverige – Mobility
Swedish ASN (SBF) – Sport
Swedish Motorcyclist (SMC) – Mobility

Automobile Club de Suisse (ACS) – Mobility
Auto Sport Suisse – Sport
Touring Club Suisse (TCS) – Mobility

Turkish Automobile Sports Federation (TOSFED) – Sport
Touring and Automobile Club of Turkey (TTOK) – Mobility
 (United Kingdom)
Automobile Association (AA) – Mobility
Camping and Caravanning Club (CCC) – Mobility
Caravan and Motorhome Club – Mobility
IAM RoadSmart – Mobility
Motorsport UK (MUK) – Sport
Royal Automobile Club (RAC) – Mobility

Automobile Federation of Ukraine (FAU) – Sport and Mobility

Pontifical Council for the Pastoral Care of Migrants and Itinerants – Mobility

North America

Antigua Pro Racing Limited – Sport

Belize Automobile Club (BAC) – Sport

Bahamas Motor Sports Association – Sport

Barbados Motoring Federation (BMF) – Sport and Mobility

Groupe de Développement Sportif (GDS) – Sport
Canadian Automobile Association (CAA) – Mobility

Automobile Club of Costa Rica (ACCR) – Sport and Mobility

Karting and Automobile Federation of Cuba (FAKC) – Sport and Mobility

Dominican Automobile Club – Mobility
Dominican Motor Racing Federation – Sport

Automobile Club of El Salvador (ACES) – Sport and Mobility

Automobile Club of Guatemala – Sport

Auto Sport Haiti – Sport and Mobility

Honduran Association of Motor Sport – Sport

Jamaica Automobile Association (JAA) – Mobility
Jamaica Millennium Motoring Club (JMMC) – Sport and Mobility

Mexican Association Automotives (AMA) – Mobility
Domestic Car Association – Mobility
Automovil Club de Mexico
Mexican International Motor Sport Federation (OMDAI) – Sport

Automotive Club of Nicaragua – Sport

Automotive Association of Touring and Sports of Panama (ASAI) – Sport and Mobility

Racing Federation of Puerto Rico – Sport and Mobility

Trinidad and Tobago Automobile Association (TAA) – Mobility
Trinidad and Tobago Automobile Sports Association (TTASA) – Sports

American Automobile Touring Alliance (AATA) – Mobility
Automobile Competition Committee for the United States (ACCUS) – Sport
Safe Kids Worldwide

Oceania

Australian Automobile Association (AAA) – Mobility
Motorsport Australia (MA) – Sport

MotorSport New Zealand (MSNZ) – Sport
New Zealand Automobile Association (NZAA) – Mobility

South America

Automovil Club Argentino (ACA) – Sport and Mobility

Bolivian Automobile Club (ACB) – Sport and Mobility

Automotive Association of Brazil (AAB) – Mobility
Brazilian Automobile Club – Mobility
Brazilian Auto Racing Confederation  (CBA) – Sport

Automobile Club of Chile – Mobility 
Chilean Federation of Motor Sport (FADECH) – Sport

Touring and Automobile Club of Colombia (ACC) – Sport and Mobility

Automobile Club of Ecuador (ANETA) – Sport and Mobility

Guyana Motor Racing and Sports Club – Sport

Touring and Automobile Club of Paraguay (TACPY) – Sport and Mobility

Touring and Automobile Club of Peru (TACP) – Sport and Mobility

Automobile Club of Uruguay (ACU) – Sport and Mobility

Touring and Automobile Club of Venezuela (TACV) – Sport and Mobility

Associate members 
International Association of Permanent Circuits
EuroRAP
International Federation of Motorhome Clubs
Fédération Internationale des Véhicules Anciens (FIVA)
International Road Assessment Programme

References

Auto racing lists
Members